Ying Khon Chua, translated into English as The Prostitute, is a Thai novel by Ko Surangkhanang. First published in 1937, it initially caused controversy in Thailand's developing literary scene, as it featured a woman forced into prostitution as its protagonist. A positive review by Prince Chula Chakrabongse contributed to the book's success, and it has since been included in the list of 100 Books Thais Should Read sponsored by the Thailand Research Fund.

References

1937 novels
Thai novels
Novels about prostitution
Works about prostitution in Thailand